Alcidion umbraticum is a species of longhorn beetles of the subfamily Lamiinae, and the only species in the genus Alcidion. It was described by Jacquelin du Val in 1857.

References

Alcidion
Beetles described in 1857